Carl Hermann Ethé or Hermann Ethé  (1844–1917) was a German orientalist best known for his catalogues of Islamic manuscripts and his studies and German translations of Persian poetry.

He occupied the Professorship of German and  Oriental Languages at the University College of Wales in Aberystwyth at the start of the First World War. He and his wife were targeted during this period due to their nationality.

Among his translations was the first portion of Qazwini's cosmography, The Wonders of Creation, published 1868.

References
 

1844 births
1917 deaths
German orientalists